New Vienna may refer to two places in the United States:
New Vienna, Iowa
New Vienna, Ohio

See also
 Vienna (disambiguation)